Papajohn is a surname, possibly derived from the Greek Papagiannis (Παπαγιάννης). It may refer to:

Michael Papajohn (born 1964), American actor and stuntman
George Papajohn, writer for the Chicago Tribune

See also
Papa John (disambiguation)
Papa John's Pizza
Pappajohn v R, a Supreme Court of Canada case about mistake of fact

Greek-language surnames
Surnames